Canara Vikas Pre University College is an educational institution run by Canara High School Association, in Mangalore, Karnataka, India.

Academics
Canara Vikas Pre-University (PU) College, is affiliated to  The Karnataka State Pre University Board. The College offers education both in Science and Commerce Streams, in English Medium. The admissions to these courses are based on the performances of the aspirants in the 10th Standard Board Examinations.

Students are given guidance for learning by Student Counselors. In this pursuit, teaching Yoga and encouraging sport activities are also a part of the.

Courses

In Science Streams the optional subjects available are:

PCMB - Physics, Chemistry, Maths, Biology
PCMC - Physics, Chemistry, Maths, Computer Science
PCMS - Physics, Chemistry, Maths, Statistics

In Commerce stream the optional subjects are:
Business Studies, 
Accountancy, 
Statistics, 
Basic Maths (BASBm)

Admission process
50% of the available seats are filled in based on the admission rules framed by Government of Karnataka. The remaining 50% is allotted to the Management Quota.

References

External links

"Vikas PU College to start from June 12"
Mangalore: Vikas PU College Inaugurated
‘Score More’ released for 10th standard students by Vikas College

Universities and colleges in Mangalore
Educational institutions established in 2012
2012 establishments in Karnataka